The 2013 European Tour was the fifth edition of the Race to Dubai and the 42nd season of golf tournaments since the European Tour officially began in 1972.

Sweden's Henrik Stenson won the Race to Dubai and was named Golfer of the Year. Peter Uihlein of the United States was the Sir Henry Cotton Rookie of the Year.

Changes for 2013
New for 2013 was the "Final Series", consisting of the final four tournaments of the season – BMW Masters, WGC-HSBC Champions, Turkish Airlines Open, and DP World Tour Championship, Dubai – with a requirement to play in two of the first three in order to compete in the DP World Tour Championship. In addition, participation in the first three events accrued a 20% bonus in the Race to Dubai standings for those events.

There were several changes from the 2012 season. Additions for 2013 were the season opening Nelson Mandela Championship, the Tshwane Open, the returning Russian Open and the Turkish Airlines Open. Dropped from the schedule were the Sicilian Open and the Barclays Singapore Open; the UBS Hong Kong Open and the South African Open were also missing from the 2013 schedule as they were played in late in the year as part of the 2014 season.

Rule changes
In a change to the European Tour's membership criteria, from 2013 the Ryder Cup, Presidents Cup and Seve Trophy were included in the 13-event minimum requirement. The move was seen as an attempt to retain leading European players based in the United States on the PGA Tour, and attract top Americans to join the tour.

Schedule
The following table lists official events during the 2013 season.

Unofficial events
The following events were sanctioned by the European Tour, but did not carry official money, nor were wins official.

Location of tournaments

Race to Dubai
Since 2009, the European Tour's money list has been known as the "Race to Dubai". It is based on money earned during the season and is calculated in euro, with earnings from tournaments that award prize money in other currencies being converted at the exchange rate available the week of the event.

Final standings
Final top 10 players in the Race to Dubai:

• Did not play

Awards

Golfer of the Month

See also
2013 in golf
2013 Challenge Tour
2013 European Senior Tour
2013 PGA Tour
List of golfers with most European Tour wins

Notes

References

External links
2013 season results on the PGA European Tour website
2013 Order of Merit on the PGA European Tour website

European Tour seasons
European Tour